Xinjiang Agricultural University (XAU) is a higher education institution in Ürümqi, the capital of the Xinjiang Uyghur Autonomous Region, China. It specializes in courses and research relating to construction in agricultural contexts.

History
XAU was founded on 1 August 1952, by the PLA general Wang Zhen under the auspices of Chairman Mao Zedong and Premier Zhou Enlai. Originally named Xinjiang Eight-One Agriculture College, it was built on the site of a PLA 2nd Infantry Division School. It was renamed Xinjiang Agricultural University on 21 April 1995.

Over the half century, XAU has developed into a multi-level and discipline institution that takes the undergraduate education as the basis with the coordinated development of doctor education, master education, international education, higher vocational education and continuing education.

Campuses
The campus of Xinjiang Agricultural University covers an area of 1496 acres. It is quiet, beautiful and well known as a garden university since its greenery is so extensive.

In addition, it has two practice farms, called Sanping and South Mountain. The former covers 2,755,800 million square meters and the latter covers more than 4,600 square meters.

Departments

School of Agriculture
School of Forestry and Horticulture
School of Grassland and Environmental Sciences
School of Animal Sciences
School of Veterinary Medicine
School of Food sciences and Pharmacy
School of Irrigation and Civil Engineering
School of Mechanical Transportation
School of Information and Computer Technology Engineering
School of Chemical Engineering
School of Mathematics
School of Economics and Trade
School of Management
School of Chinese Language Studies
School of Foreign Languages
Education and Research Department for Philosophy, Politics and Theory
Education and Research Department for Physical Sports
School of International Education
School of Continuing Education
School of Science and Technology
Centre for MPA Education

Faculty
There are over 800 faculty and over 20,000 students at XAU. From 1986 to the present, more than 800 long- and short-term foreign students from 20 countries who have finished their study and graduated from XAU in the disciplines of Chinese language, Uygur language, Kazak language, animal husbandry and grassland, etc. Xinjiang Uygur Autonomous Region where XAU is located is a multi-ethnic area.

See also
 List of universities in Xinjiang
 List of universities in China

References

Education in Ürümqi
Universities and colleges in Xinjiang
Educational institutions established in 1952
1952 establishments in China